Gorga may refer to:

Places
Gorga, Italy, a municipality in the province of Rome, Lazio, Italy
Gorga, Spain, a municipality in the province of Alicante, Valencian Community, Spain
Gorga Cilento or Gorga, a village in the municipality of Stio, province of Salerno, Compania, Italy
Gorga, Udmurtia or Garga, a hamlet in the Alnashsky District of Udmurtia, Russia

Other
Gorga the Hutt, a character of Star Wars.